William T. McElhany (born 1833 in New York) served as a member of the 1867–1869 California State Assembly, representing the 3rd District. He was a member of the Union party.

References

Year of death missing
Place of death missing
Members of the California State Assembly
1833 births